The 1978–79 Boston College Eagles men's basketball team represented Boston College during the 1978–79 NCAA men's basketball season.

In 1981, forward Rick Kuhn was convicted of conspiracy in a point shaving scheme in which he, guard Jim Sweeney, and possibly other members of the team attempted to manipulate the scores of some games on behalf of organized crime.  Kuhn was sentenced to 10 years in prison, later reduced to 28 months. Sweeney testified that he acted under duress, and was not charged.

Roster

See also
1978–79 Boston College basketball point shaving scandal

References

Boston College Eagles men's basketball seasons
Boston College
Boston Coll
Boston Coll